Hotel Olympik is a large hotel in the Karlín area of the 8th district of Prague, Czech Republic. The hotel is near the housing facility Invalidovna and the stadium of Čechie Karlín. Hotel Olympik is located at 138 Sokolovská Street.

History
The Hotel Olympik was designed by a team or architects led by Josef Polak between 1967 and 1971. hotel was opened to the public in 1973.

The hotel was finished in 1974, and at the time had 715 beds. A fire in the hotel in 1995 took 8 lives and resulted in damages of 35 million CZK.

On 5 October 2008 thieves broke into the hotel safe and stole about the equivalent to CZK 1.000.000,00 in different currencies ( about US$55,500.00 ) and  a large number of shares from the Olympic Holding Company.

In 2015 the hotel was given a new brightly coloured facade.

1980 Summer Olympics 

According to some experts, Hotel Olympik was built in preparation of Prague's bid to host the 1980 Summer Olympics. The housing area Invalidovna would have been the Olympic village. After Moscow placed a bid, Prague withdrew its application.  The hotel is not in a tourist area; it hosts many conferences and business gatherings.

Photogallery

References 
''This article is based on a translation of the Czech Wikipedia article Hotel Olympik.

External links

 

1974 establishments in Czechoslovakia
Hotels in Prague
Hotels established in 1974
Hotel buildings completed in 1974
20th-century architecture in the Czech Republic